In chronological order, the names, signs, colors etc. of the 24 Tirthankaras.

The total length of the lifespans of all 24 Tīrthaṅkaras combined equals 2.603672 sextillion years.

References